Eivor Matilda Astergren, née Alm (29 June 1924 – 5 March 2011) was a Swedish cross-country skier who competed in the 1950s. She finished ninth in the 10 km event at the 1952 Winter Olympics in Oslo. She was born in Almunge.

Cross-country skiing results

Olympic Games

External links
List of all Swedish finishers FIS Nordic World Ski Championships, incl. Winter Olympics of 1924-80: 1924-2007 
Eivor Alm's obituary 

1924 births
2011 deaths
People from Uppsala Municipality
Cross-country skiers from Uppsala County
Olympic cross-country skiers of Sweden
Cross-country skiers at the 1952 Winter Olympics
Swedish female cross-country skiers
20th-century Swedish women